Gregory Sambou (born 25 October 1994) is a Gambian international footballer who plays for Real de Banjul, as a defender.

Career
Born in Banjul, he has played club football for Young Africans, Gambia Ports Authority and Real de Banjul.

He made his international debut for Gambia in 2016.

References

1996 births
Living people
Gambian footballers
The Gambia international footballers
Gambia Ports Authority FC players
Real de Banjul FC players
Association football defenders